Ernest Dion Wilson (born June 23, 1971), professionally known as No I.D. (formerly Immenslope), is an American hip hop and R&B producer from Chicago, Illinois. Wilson is also a disc jockey (DJ), music arranger and former rapper, having released an album Accept Your Own and Be Yourself (The Black Album), in 1997 under Relativity Records. He is perhaps best known for his early work with Chicago-based rapper Common. He has since become a heavily sought-out and high-profile producer, producing hit singles such as "Smile" by G-Unit, "Outta My System" and "Let Me Hold You" by Bow Wow, "Heartless" by Kanye West, "D.O.A." by Jay-Z, "My Last" by Big Sean, and "New Light" by John Mayer.

Wilson, who has served as a musical mentor for several artists such as Kanye West and J. Cole, is considered "The Godfather of Chicago hip hop". Wilson was once president of West's GOOD Music record company, and although he would resign from that position, he stayed contracted as an in-house producer. In June 2011, Wilson announced he formed the supergroup Cocaine 80s, alongside Common and several other artists. In August 2011, Wilson became the Executive Vice President of A&R for Def Jam Recordings and subsequently launched his own record label imprint, ARTium Recordings, having signed acts such as Jhené Aiko, Vince Staples, and Snoh Aalegra. He is currently the Executive Vice President at Capitol Music Group.

Musical career
In 1996, Wilson released an album under the pseudonym No I.D., titled Accept Your Own and Be Yourself (The Black Album). The moniker No I.D. is a play on the backwards spelling of his birth name, Dion. He also released a beat tape, titled Invisible Beats. In Wilson's early career he was working as a co-producer for Jermaine Dupri. No I.D. went on to work on hit singles such as "My Boo" by Usher and Alicia Keys and "Let Me Hold You" by Bow Wow featuring Omarion, as well as "Resurrection" and the ode to hip hop "I Used to Love H.E.R.", which garnered Chicago-based rapper Common his early fame. Wilson also introduced Chicago-based rapper Kanye West to hip hop production, inviting him to his sessions with Common, when West was only beginning. He also introduced West to a long-time friend named Kyambo "Hip Hop" Joshua, who was A&R for Roc-A-Fella Records, who eventually signed West to his imprint Hip Hop Since 1978, which launched West's career as an artist and into stardom. West cites Wilson as his mentor on "Last Call," the outro to his highly acclaimed debut album The College Dropout (2004). West also referenced Wilson's mentorship on songs such as "Big Brother" and "Made in America." Wilson's second official release was with Dug Infinite, a two-album package titled The Sampler, vol. 1 (2002).

In 2007, he was the focus of perhaps the most attention of his career for producing two songs from Jay-Z's album American Gangster. At the time he worked with artists such as Jay-Z, Rhymefest, Plies, Big Sean, Killer Mike, Rick Ross, Drake (Thank Me Later) and Kanye West (808's & Heartbreak, My Beautiful Dark Twisted Fantasy), Young Jeezy, and Rihanna on their then-upcoming albums. Wilson produced "D.O.A. (Death of Auto-Tune)", the first single for Jay-Z's eleventh studio album The Blueprint 3 (2009), as well as the second single "Run This Town", which features Kanye West and Rihanna. He once again teamed up with Common for the first time since 1997, when he handled the production for his ninth album The Dreamer/The Believer (2011). In June 2011, Wilson formed Cocaine 80s, a musical ensemble composed of several musicians, including Common, James Fauntleroy II, Kevin Randolph, Makeba Riddick, Rob "The Mixer" Kinelski, Steve Wyreman, Free Bass, Keys of Coke and Sam Lewis, among several others.

After resigning as President of Kanye West's G.O.O.D. Music record company, in August 2011, it was announced No I.D. was appointed Executive Vice President of A&R for Def Jam Recordings. In addition, Def Jam has signed an exclusive joint venture label deal for No I.D.'s Artium Recordings. The announcements were made by Barry Weiss, Chairman and CEO of Universal Republic and Island Def Jam Motown and Karen Kwak, EVP / Head of A&R, Island Def Jam Music Group. In 2012, Wilson was an executive producer on New York City-based rapper Nas' critically acclaimed eleventh album Life Is Good, producing five songs, including the twice Grammy Award-nominated single "Daughters", as well as "Loco-Motive" and "Accident Murderers".In April 2013, it was revealed Wilson signed up-and-coming rapper Logic, to Def Jam.  In 2013, Wilson served as the primary producer of G.O.O.D. Music recording artist Big Sean's second album Hall of Fame. In an August 2013 interview with Complex, Wilson said he was currently working on Jhene Aiko and Logic's upcoming respective debut albums. Since the inception of Artium, Wilson has signed Common, Los Angeles-based singer Jhené Aiko and singer Elijah Blake. On June 30, 2017, Wilson was credited as the primary producer on 4:44 - a new album released via Tidal by Jay-Z. The album has been met with widespread acclaim from music reviews and is notable for the personal account of Jay-Z's alleged infidelity on the title track. 4:44 was the latest installment in an extensive professional relationship between the two, as No I.D. has produced more tracks for Jay-Z than anyone else other than Just Blaze and Timbaland.

ARTium Recordings

ARTium Recordings is an American record label imprint, founded by No I.D. In August 2011, it was announced No I.D. was appointed Executive Vice President of A&R for Def Jam Recordings. In addition, Def Jam has signed an exclusive joint venture label deal for No I.D.'s ARTium Recordings. The announcements were made by Barry Weiss, Chairman and CEO of Universal Republic and Island Def Jam Motown and Karen Kwak, EVP / Head of A&R, Island Def Jam Music Group. No I.D. would report directly to Mr. Weiss and Ms. Kwak. In 2012, No I.D. signed American neo-soul singer Jhené Aiko. By September 2013, No I.D. had signed up-and-coming American R&B singers Elijah Blake and Snoh Aalegra On June 4, 2014, it was announced No I.D.'s longtime collaborator and Chicago-bred rapper Common, signed a recording contract with Def Jam Recordings and ARTium Recordings.

Artists (past and present) 
 Cocaine 80s
 Common
 Jhené Aiko
 Jordan Ward
 Snoh Aalegra
 Vince Staples
 DJ Dahi
 Mark Battles
 Ogi

Discography

Discography

Studio albums

Singles

Guest appearances

Production discography

Singles produced

Awards and nominations

Grammy Awards

|-
|rowspan="2"|2010
|"Run This Town"
|rowspan="6"|Best Rap Song
|
|-
|"D.O.A. (Death of Auto-Tune)"
|
|-
|rowspan="1"|2013
|"Daughters"
|
|-
|rowspan="1"|2014
|"Holy Grail"
|
|-
|rowspan="1"|2015
|"Bound 2"
|
|-
|rowspan="5"|2018
|rowspan="2"|"The Story of O.J."
|
|-
|Record of the Year
|
|-
|"4:44"
|Song of the Year
|
|-
|"4:44"
|Album of the Year
|
|-
|Himself
|Producer of the Year, Non-Classical
|

See also
 Honorific nicknames in popular music

References

External links
 
 
 

1971 births
Living people
American hip hop record producers
African-American record producers
African-American songwriters
African-American male rappers
Rappers from Chicago
Songwriters from Illinois
Midwest hip hop musicians
GOOD Music artists
Roc Nation artists
American music industry executives
American hip hop DJs
American music arrangers
Record producers from Illinois
Grammy Award winners for rap music
21st-century American rappers
Cocaine 80s members